David Blunkett, Baron Blunkett,  (born 6 June 1947) is a British Labour Party politician who has been a Member of the House of Lords since 2015, and previously served as the Member of Parliament (MP) for  Sheffield Brightside and Hillsborough from  1987 to 2015, when he stood down. Blind since birth, and coming from a poor family in one of Sheffield's most deprived districts, he rose to become Education and Employment Secretary, Home Secretary and Work and Pensions Secretary in Tony Blair's Cabinet following Labour's victory in the 1997 general election.

Following the 2001 general election, he was promoted to Home Secretary, a position he held until 2004, when he resigned following publicity about his personal life. Following the 2005 general election, he was appointed Secretary of State for Work and Pensions, though he resigned from that role later that year following media coverage relating to external business interests in the period when he did not hold a cabinet post. The Cabinet Secretary Gus O'Donnell exonerated him from any wrongdoing in his letter of 25 November 2005.

On 20 June 2014, Blunkett announced to his constituency party that he would be standing down from the House of Commons at the next general election in May 2015. The editor of the conservative The Spectator magazine, Fraser Nelson, commented, "He was never under-briefed, and never showed any sign of his disability ... he was one of Labour's very best MPs – and one of the very few people in parliament whose life I would describe as inspirational." Responding to a question from Blunkett on 11 March 2015, Prime Minister David Cameron said: "As a new backbencher, I will never forget coming to this place in 2001 and, in the light of the appalling terrorist attacks that had taken place across the world, seeing the strong leadership he gave on the importance of keeping our country safe. He is a remarkable politician, a remarkable man."

In May 2015, he accepted a professorship in Politics in Practice at the University of Sheffield (in 2014 he was invited to be a Fellow of the Academy of Social Sciences), and in June 2015 he agreed to become chairman of the Board of the University of Law. In addition to his other work with charities, he was also chairman of the David Ross Multi Academy Charitable Trust from June 2015 to January 2017. He is the honorary president of the Association for Citizenship Teaching (ACT).

In August 2015, he was awarded a peerage in the 2015 Dissolution Honours. He was created Baron Blunkett, of Brightside and Hillsborough in the City of Sheffield, on 28 September.

Early life
Blunkett was born on 6 June 1947 at Jessop Hospital, Sheffield, West Riding of Yorkshire, with improperly developed optic nerves due to a rare genetic disorder. He grew up in an underprivileged family; in 1959 he endured a family tragedy when his father was gravely injured in an industrial accident: he fell into a vat of boiling water while at work as a foreman for the East Midlands Gas Board, dying a month later. This left the surviving family in poverty, especially since the board refused to pay compensation for two years because his father worked past the retirement age, dying at age 67.

Blunkett was educated at schools for the blind in Sheffield and Shrewsbury. He attended the Royal National College for the Blind in Hereford. He was apparently told at school that one of his few options in life was to become a lathe operator. Nevertheless, he won a place at the University of Sheffield, where he gained a BA honours degree in Political Theory and Institutions; one of his lecturers was Bernard Crick. He entered local politics on graduation, whilst gaining a Postgraduate Certificate in Education from Huddersfield Holly Bank College of Education (now part of the University of Huddersfield). He spent a total of six years going to evening classes and day-release classes to get the qualifications needed to go to university. He worked as a clerk typist between 1967 and 1969 and as a lecturer in industrial relations and politics between 1973 and 1981.

By 1970, Blunkett was a Methodist local preacher based at Southey church in the Sheffield (North) circuit of the Methodist Connexion. He told the Methodist Recorder "My politics come directly from my religion. As a Christian I seen myself as a Socialist; not exactly a Donald Soper, but that way inclined". At that point, he was engaged to Ruth Mitchell and they planned to marry in July.

Local government 
In 1970, at the age of 22, Blunkett became the youngest-ever councillor on Sheffield City Council and in Britain, being elected while a mature student. He was elected on the same day as fellow Labour member Bill Michie who like Blunkett would go on to serve as a Sheffield MP. Blunkett served on Sheffield City Council from 1970 to 1988, and was Leader from 1980 to 1987. He also served on South Yorkshire County Council from 1973 to 1977. This was a time of decline for Sheffield's steel industry. Blunkett and Michie were among  what political journalist Julia Langdon has described as  "an energetic group of young Labour activists who emerged in Sheffield in the 1970s, a number of whom moved on to Westminster". The Conservative MP for Sheffield Hallam, Irvine Patnick, coined the phrase "Socialist Republic of South Yorkshire" to describe the left-wing politics of its local government.  Although bestowed as a criticism of the radical policies being pursued by  Labour councillors in the area, Langdon notes that it "was in fact happily embraced by those it was intended to denigrate". Sheffield City Council supported the National Union of Mineworkers in their 1984–85 strike, designated Sheffield a "nuclear-free zone", and set up an Anti-Apartheid Working Party. Blunkett became known as the leader of one of Labour's left-wing councils, sometimes described pejoratively as "loony left". Blunkett was one of the faces of the protest over rate-capping in 1985 which saw several Labour councils refuse to set a budget in a protest against Government powers to restrain their spending. He built up support within the Labour Party during his time as the council's leader during the 1980s, and was elected to the Labour Party's National Executive Committee.

Parliamentary career
Having unsuccessfully fought Sheffield Hallam in February 1974, at the 1987 general election he was elected Member of Parliament (MP) for Sheffield Brightside with a large majority in a safe Labour seat. He became a party spokesman on local government, joined the shadow cabinet in 1992 as Shadow Health Secretary and became Shadow Education Secretary in 1994.

Education and Employment Secretary
Following Labour's landslide victory in the 1997 general election, he became Secretary of State for Education and Employment, thus becoming Britain's first blind cabinet minister (Henry Fawcett, husband of suffragist Millicent Fawcett, had been a member of the Privy Council, of which the Cabinet is the executive committee, more than a century before). The role of Education Secretary was a vital one in a government whose prime minister had in 1996 described his priorities as "education, education, education" and which had made reductions in school class sizes a pledge.

As Secretary of State, Blunkett pursued conservative reforms, ready to take on the teaching unions and determined to ensure basic standards of literacy and numeracy. He was rewarded with extra funding to cut class sizes, and subsequently there has since 1997 been a massive increase in literacy and numeracy, and there are 42,000 more teachers than in 1997, with doubled spending per pupil in frontline schools (and over 100,000 teaching assistants) through to 2010. A key pillar of Blunkett's work as Education Secretary was the introduction of Sure Start, a government programme which provides services for pre-school children and their families. It works to bring together early education, childcare, health and family support. In 2011, the government effectively started the abolition of Sure Start by lifting the ring fence on earmarked funding and cutting back drastically on the funds available.

Blunkett also led the massive expansion in higher education. He provided large scale investment in universities in the UK and one recent study, covering up to the decade of 2013, showed that universities are now educating more than one-quarter more students than they did previously and receiving double the income they did.

Also in this position, Blunkett launched Learning and Skills Councils, created Job Centre Plus and had responsibility for the Equal Opportunities Commission, as well as establishing the Disability Rights Commission (as Home Secretary, he was also responsible for the Commission on Racial Equality – all three of these bodies were incorporated later into the Equality and Human Rights Commission).

In 1999, Blunkett proposed that sex education should not be pursued until children have left primary school at 11, reportedly arguing that childhood, the "age of innocence", should not be compromised by "graphic" sex education. In 2000, while attempting to cool opposition to the proposed abolition of the Local Government Act 1988's Section 28, he issued guidelines on the importance of 'family values' in teaching children sex education.

Blunkett introduced the teaching of citizenship in schools in 1999, arguing that "We want to ensure that there's a basis of traditional knowledge that's available to all children." Citizenship education provides pupils with the knowledge, skills and understanding to become informed citizens, aware of their rights, duties and responsibilities.

Home Secretary
At the start of the Labour government's second term in 2001, Blunkett was promoted to Home Secretary, fulfilling an ambition of his. Some observers saw him a rival to Chancellor of the Exchequer Gordon Brown in succeeding Blair as Prime Minister.

Blunkett was almost immediately faced with September 11 attacks on the United States. He brought in new anti-terrorism measures, including detention without trial of suspect foreign nationals who could not be extradited or deported. It caused a backbench rebellion and provoked strong opposition in the House of Lords, and Blunkett made concessions over incitement to religious hatred (later carried through by his successor) and to introduce a "sunset clause". He authorised MI5 to start collecting bulk telephone communications data on which telephone numbers called each other and when, authorised under a little understood general power under the Telecommunications Act 1984 instead of the Regulation of Investigatory Powers Act 2000 which would have brought independent oversight and regulation. This was kept secret until announced by the then Home Secretary in 2015.

As Home Secretary, he was prepared to confront the judiciary and the police, with proposals for civilian community patrols and changes to police officers' pay and working conditions. More than 7,000 police demonstrated outside Parliament in 2002.

Also during his term in office, the massive upsurge in asylum claims was reversed, the Sangatte refugee camp on French soil was closed, and refugees numbers subsequently dropped from 110,000 to less than 30,000. With an additional 15,000 police officers and 6,500 Community Support Officers by 2004, crime had reached an all-time low with over a 40% drop from ten years earlier.

A controversial area for Blunkett was civil liberties, and he described civil libertarianism as "airy fairy". As Education Secretary, he had repeatedly expressed the intention that, were he to become Home Secretary, he would make the then-incumbent Jack Straw, who had been criticised for being hard-line, seem over-liberal. In 2006, Martin Narey, the former director general of the prison service, claimed that Blunkett had once told him to use the army and machine guns, to deal with rioting prisoners. Blunkett has denied these allegations.

Blunkett radically overhauled 'Victorian' sex offences legislation in 2002, which modernised the sex offences laws dramatically in relation to same-sex and related issues by sweeping away the archaic laws governing homosexuality, while tightening protections against rapists, paedophiles and other sex offenders. The act closed a loophole that had allowed those accused of child rape to escape punishment by arguing the act was consensual and a new offence of adult sexual activity with a child, which covers any sex act that takes place between an adult and a child under 16, was introduced. It was supported by all major political parties in the UK.

In 2004, it emerged that Blunkett had directed Home Office civil servants to closely monitor and counter the findings of MigrationWatch UK, which controversially included manipulating the timing of statistical releases to avoid criticism from the pressure group.

Blunkett resigned as Home Secretary on 15 December 2004 amidst allegations that he helped fast-track the renewal of a work permit for his ex-lover's nanny.

Blunkett thanked the Jewish community in 2005 for its "extraordinary support" when "things got difficult" in his personal and professional life and said that "I won't let you down. I feel deeply honoured when friends from the Jewish community are prepared to welcome me. I feel like one of the family." While he was born a Methodist, his son with Kimberly Quinn attended a Jewish nursery, as Quinn has Jewish heritage. In 2005, he was presented with an honorary doctorate by Haifa University. He is a member of Labour Friends of Israel.

The accusations made against him in November 2004 formed part of an acrimonious public conflict playing out in the Family Court in respect of contested Contact and Responsibility Orders. Clarity about the circumstances and events leading up to and surrounding his departure emerged in the phone hacking trial of 2013/14. In 2011, Blunkett had negotiated a private £300,000 settlement with News International over the hacking of his phone. Details of the settlement were later revealed by The Observer. On 24 June 2014, Andy Coulson, former editor of the News of the World and Head of Communications for David Cameron, was found guilty of a charge of conspiracy to intercept voicemails.

Brief return to the cabinet

Following the 2005 general election, Blunkett was returned to the cabinet as Secretary of State for Work and Pensions, where he faced a growing pensions crisis.

Two weeks before the election, Blunkett took up a directorship in a company called DNA Bioscience and bought £15,000 of shares in the company. After sustained questions over a six-month period, Blunkett was asked on 31 October 2005 to explain why he had not consulted the Advisory Committee on Business Appointments regarding the directorship. Having placed the shares into an independent trust, he said that the trustees had agreed to dispose of the shares.

Blunkett's political opponents claimed that a conflict of interest was created by him having been director of and holding shares in a company proposing to bid for government contracts to provide paternity tests to the Child Support Agency (CSA) – part of the Department for Work and Pensions (DWP), of which he was Secretary of State. On 2 November, a scheduled appearance before a House of Commons Select Committee was cancelled at the last minute and Blunkett was summoned to a meeting at 10 Downing Street. Later that morning, a spokesman for Prime Minister Tony Blair confirmed Blunkett had resigned at the meeting, stating that his position had become untenable. This became the main focus of discussion at the session of Prime Minister's Questions that afternoon, and Conservative leader Michael Howard described the event as 'the beginning of the final chapter of (Blair's) administration'.

Blunkett was later found not to have broken the ministerial code. On 25 November 2005, after he had resigned, Gus O'Donnell wrote to Blunkett confirming that there was no conflict of interest, no failure to declare either Blunkett's shareholding or brief business connection with the company. O'Donnell wrote: "The issue of shareholdings and trusts and the handling of private interests more generally is of course covered quite extensively in Section 5 of the Ministerial Code. There is no ban on a Minister, or his or her immediate family members, holding such interests but where they do the Minister must ensure that no conflict arises, or appears to arise, between his or her public duties and such private interests. In terms of the handling of your interests, and those of your family, you followed correct procedure in notifying your Permanent Secretary of your interests. Neither the DWP nor the CSA were in any contractual relationship with DNA Bioscience, and the CSA's contract for biometric testing was not due to be renewed for some years."

O'Donnell also confirmed that the Advisory Committee on Ministerial Appointments, which had been the bone of contention up to the beginning of November 2005, was in fact voluntary. The code was changed in 2007 to make clear that references prior to taking business appointments shortly after leaving government was to be mandatory as part of the ministerial code.

Despite his resignation from the cabinet in November, Blunkett initially kept his ministerial accommodation in Belgravia, London, until he found new accommodation four months later. He also rents a cottage on the estate of Chatsworth House.

Backbenches
Blunkett is a Vice President of the Royal National Institute of Blind People and a vice president of the National Alzheimer's Society, and has close links with a range of other charities (local to Sheffield and nationally) including those relating to substance abuse and breast cancer, and is a Patron of the Employers Network for Equality and Inclusion (enei). He is also a patron of The Micro and Anophthalmic Children's Society, a charity for children born without eyes or with underdeveloped eyes. He is also a former Honorary Chair of the Information Systems Security Association (ISSA-UK) Advisory Board and was, until March 2015, chairman of the not-for-profit International Cyber Security Protection Alliance (ICSPA).

In October 2010, Blunkett proposed the creation of a 'Yorkshire Parliament' giving autonomy to the historic county with a similar funding formula to the Welsh Assembly's devolved budget, which would entitle Yorkshire to annual budget of around £24 Billion.

One of his main interests is volunteering and community service. In 2011, he published a pamphlet calling for a National Volunteer Programme, which received a wide range of support, particularly among third sector organisations. Since then, Blunkett has commenced putting together and becoming a founder of the Future For Youth Foundation, which sought to tackle high levels of unemployment in young people and which concluded its work in the summer of 2015.

He was a key voice in the 'No to AV' campaign in 2010–11 and has spoken out against the Government's proposed boundary changes.

In September 2012, he published In Defence of Politics Revisited, where he set out a range of proposals to increase faith in, and improve the working of, democratic politics. He was later awarded status as an Academician of the Academy of Social Sciences. In July 2013, Sheffield University announced Blunkett had become a visiting professor in the Department of Politics, in the world's first Centre for the Public Understanding of Politics.

He sits on the board of the National Citizen Service Trust, a voluntary community service programme for 16- and 17-year-olds. From 2013 to 2014, he chaired a parliamentary inquiry with the Charities Aid Foundation into how giving to charities could be boosted. This reported in June 2014, making recommendations ranging from the inclusion of a 'social action' section on UCAS forms to the creation of a post-careers advice service, for those who are retiring but wish to continue giving in their community. This led to the National Citizen Service Act coming into law in 2017.

Between June 2013 and May 2014, Blunkett led a review into local oversight of schools and the raising of standards for the leader Ed Miliband and the Shadow Education Secretary. The 'Blunkett Report' was published in May 2014, and called for the creation of new independent Directors of School Standards to operate between local authorities. These directors would focus on bringing greater coherence to the process of school creation, raising standards and improving local accountability.

In June 2014, he announced he would not be contesting the election in the following year, stating that he had realised he would not be returning to the frontbenches. In his letter he wrote: "it is clear that the leadership of the Party wish to see new faces in Ministerial office and a clear break with the past".

Later career
In 2013, Blunkett joined the advisory board of global wealth consultancy Oracle Capital Group, continuing in that role to 2017.

Blunkett became chair of the David Ross Education Trust, one of Britain's largest Multi-academy trusts, sponsored by Carphone Warehouse founder David Ross, in 2015.  He resigned in 2017 along with several others members of board when the sponsor would not acknowledge or take action on major issues raised about governance procedures, and the blocking of an independent review initiated by Blunkett and the then Chief Executive Wendy Marshall.

Blunkett was appointed as Professor of Politics in Practice at the University of Sheffield in June 2015. In 2017, he received an Honorary Doctorate for services to government and education from the University of Huddersfield.

Professor Robert D. Putnam, the Peter and Isabel Malkin Professor of Public Policy at the Harvard University, speaking about David's time in the Home Office in a webinar in February 2021 said: "He was, at that time, THE most far-sighted communitarian on either side of the Atlantic that I met. We spent hours in his office – in his office at the Home Office – talking about what we could do... to bring people together, even in the face of crises that he saw before anybody else in the British political elite... David is a national treasure in the UK.

Blunkett fears intelligence agencies in the UK and abroad may be reluctant to share information because Suella Braverman became home secretary again days after resigning due to a security breach.  Blunkett said in the House of Lords "Isn't it true there could be two really unfortunate outcomes to the reappointment of the current Home Secretary? [Suella Braverman]  One is that the security and intelligence services will be reluctant to provide the briefings and the openness needed.  And the second is that other international security agencies will be reluctant to share with us if they are fearful that their information will be passed out of Government itself."

Writing, speaking, and television appearances

In October 2006, Blunkett's audio diaries were published in his book The Blunkett Tapes: My Life in the Bear Pit. The tapes detail his time as a cabinet minister until the present date, and provide insights into the workings of the Labour cabinet. They were recorded every week, and contain his view of what was happening in Cabinet at the time, alongside contemporary reflections and more recent thoughts on the events. He also published a light-hearted dog-oriented look back at his life so far, in On a Clear Day, published by Michael O'Mara Books in 1995.

Blunkett has also co-authored a number of publications including Building from the Bottom (1982), published by the Fabian Society, and Democracy in Crisis (1987), published by Hogarth, which described the battle between local and central government in the Thatcher years. He has also contributed chapters to many books relating to politics and social policy and has also produced research papers with the University of Sheffield. Other publications include "Ladders Out of Poverty" in 2006 and "Mutual Action, Common Purpose" in 2009 (relating to the voluntary sector).

Outside politics, Blunkett enjoys a career as a popular conference and after dinner speaker. His booking agency JLA state that his speech topics include "The Political Landscape, Overcoming Adversity, Social Responsibility and Diversity." Blunkett has also given lectures and contributed to debates at the Institute of Art and Ideas.

Blunkett has made many radio and television appearances. He took part in a celebrity version of Mastermind, where his specialist subject was Harry Potter. He finished last, scoring 11 points. He was featured on the Channel Five documentary series Banged Up in 2008. Blunkett also appeared as a celebrity chef, competing against Gordon Ramsay, on season 4 episode 4 of the British television series The F Word. In 2018, Blunkett featured on the University Challenge Christmas editions, representing Sheffield.

Personal life

Blunkett divorced his wife of 20 years, Ruth Mitchell, by whom he had three sons, in 1990. In 2004, the News of the World revealed a three-year affair with Kimberly Quinn, a married former publisher of The Spectator, and the disputed parentage of their then two-year-old child. After prolonged press speculation, DNA tests showed that Blunkett was the father. In 2005, The People newspaper launched a cycle of media speculation about Blunkett's alleged relationship with a young woman. The newspaper later apologised, admitting that the story was entirely false.

In January 2009, Blunkett announced that he was engaged to be married to Margaret Williams, a doctor in Sheffield. They married the same year.

Blunkett's guide dogs – Ruby, Teddy, Offa, Lucy, Sadie, Cosby, and Barley – became familiar characters in the House of Commons, usually sleeping at his feet on the floor of the chamber, inspiring occasional comments from Blunkett and his fellow MPs on both sides of the house. In one incident, Lucy (a cross between a black Labrador and a curly coat retriever) vomited during a speech by Conservative member David Willetts. On one occasion, his new guide dog led him to the Conservative Party benches.

Disability rights activists have been highly critical of Blunkett's passivity in relation to disability activism. In Times Higher Education, leading activist Paul Darke called Blunkett "in denial of his impairment as a valid and different experience".

Popular culture references
Blunkett was portrayed by Phil Cornwell in The Comic Strip Presents's 1992 film Red Nose of Courage. He was parodied in the TV comedy Believe Nothing. Satirist Alistair Beaton wrote the television film A Very Social Secretary, for Channel 4, which was screened in October 2005. He was played by Bernard Hill. He appears regularly both on news and magazine programmes, and he was the subject of an episode of The House I Grew Up In. In 2014, the Grime MC Chronik released the track "Go Blunkett" on his critically acclaimed "Rise of the Lengman" LP.

References

Bibliography
Building from the Bottom (1982), published by the Fabian Society

External links 
David Blunkett MP official constituency blog

What is Labour for?, John Lancaster, London Review of Books, 31 March 2005, review of the biography David Blunkett by Stephen Pollard
Advisory Committee on Business Appointments
"Ministerial conduct and guidance"
Disclosure of non-sale of shares

Resignation as Home Secretary
BBC News In Depth – Blunkett Resignation
Text of David Blunkett's resignation statement
Budd Report (fast-tracking of visa)
Mawer Report (inappropriate use of taxpayer-funded rail ticket)
British Home Secretary quits amid scandal

Paternity battle
"Blunkett 'did not father child'" – BBC News

|-

|-

|-

|-

|-

|-

|-

1947 births
Living people
Alumni of the Royal National College for the Blind
Alumni of the University of Sheffield
English blind people
Blind politicians
British politicians with disabilities
British Secretaries of State for Education
Chairs of the Labour Party (UK)
Councillors in Sheffield
English diarists
European democratic socialists
British socialists
Labour Party (UK) MPs for English constituencies
Labour Party (UK) life peers
Life peers created by Elizabeth II
Labour Friends of Israel
Members of the Privy Council of the United Kingdom
Methodist local preachers
Secretaries of State for the Home Department
UK MPs 1987–1992
UK MPs 1992–1997
UK MPs 1997–2001
UK MPs 2001–2005
UK MPs 2005–2010
UK MPs 2010–2015
Secretaries of State for Work and Pensions
Blind academics